Krist is both a given name and surname. Notable people with the name include:

Augustin Krist (20th century), Czech football referee
Gary Krist (writer) (born 1957), American writer
Gary Steven Krist (born 1945), American criminal
Gustav Krist (1894-1937), Austrian adventurer, prisoner-of-war, carpet-dealer and author
Krist Novoselic (born 1965), American rock musician

See also 
Crist (surname)
Christ (disambiguation)
Krista
Kristo (disambiguation)
Kristi (name)
Kristy
Kryst, surname
Kristić, surname

German-language surnames